Deniz Çakır (born 31 December 1982) is a Turkish film and television actress. She made her television debut with her role as Alev in hit revenge series Kadın İsterse. Çakır is best known for her role in the popular television series, Muhteşem Yüzyıl as Şah Sultan, and for her character Ferhunde in hit series Yaprak Dökümü based classic novel. She is especially known for her role in the popular TV series Eşkıya Dünyaya Hükümdar Olmaz as Meryem Çakırbeyli.

Filmography

Turkish Dubbing

Theatre

References

External links
 

1981 births
Living people
People from Ankara
Turkish film actresses
Turkish television actresses